Van Klaveren is a Dutch toponymic surname meaning "from clovers"", perhaps referring to a dairy farmer's clover field.  Notable people with the surname include:

Adrian Van Klaveren (born 1961), British BBC executive
Alberto van Klaveren (born 1948), Dutch-born Chilean diplomat
Bep van Klaveren (1907–1992), Dutch Olympic and European champion boxer
Gerard van Klaveren (born 1951), Dutch politician, Honorary Consul of Iceland
Joram van Klaveren (born 1979), Dutch PVV politician
Noël van Klaveren (born 1995), Dutch artistic gymnast
Piet van Klaveren (1930–2008), Dutch boxer, younger brother of Bep

References

Dutch-language surnames
Surnames of Dutch origin
Toponymic surnames